The following are the association football events of the year 1881 throughout the world.

Events

Clubs founded in 1881

France
FC Girondins de Bordeaux

England
Berwick Rangers F.C.
Leyton Orient F.C.
Southport F.C.
Swindon Town F.C.
Watford F.C.

Scotland
East Stirlingshire F.C.

Wales
Colwyn Bay F.C.

Domestic cups

Births
 9 February – Jimmy Hay (d. 1940), Scotland international half-back in eleven matches (1905–1914).
 22 May – Colin Veitch (d. 1938), England international half-back in six matches (1906–1909).
 3 July – Horace Bailey (d. 1960), England international goalkeeper in five matches (1908).
 19 July – Stanley Harris (d. 1926), England international forward in six matches (1904–1906), scoring two goals.
 22 August – Harry Makepeace (d. 1952), England international half-back in four matches (1906–1912); also a cricket international.
 20 September – Alex Bennett (d. 1940), Scotland international forward in eleven matches (1904–1913).

References

 
Association football by year